The Perret tower, originally called La tour pour regarder les montagnes ("The tower for looking at the mountains"), is an observation tower located in Grenoble, in the Paul Mistral public park. It is the first tower built in reinforced concrete in Europe. In 1998, it was officially declared to be a national heritage site. It was built for the International Exhibition of Hydropower and Tourism where it was the orientation tower and the symbol of the exhibition. Nowadays, it is the last vestige of this exhibition.

Architecture
Its section is octagonal. The framework is compound of eight vertical poles.
The last floor is reachable by helical stairs (visible in the top openwork part) or by lift.

Auguste Perret, with the assistance of Marie Dormoy, art critic, came to Grenoble for two years, to do conferences and meet political and artistic circles in order to promote a "reinforced concrete order"; a reference to the antique orders.

Made of the first reinforced concrete, the tower is also the first free-standing project made by Auguste Perret, its architect.

The tower is the sum of an architectural and structural thought particularly modern and exact. It is a reinforced concrete structure whose formworks are modular and repetitive, and the prefabricated fillings are re-used from the "Notre-Dame du Raincy" church. Despite criticism during its construction, it was later deemed a success and cost half as much as the other edifices of the exhibition.

It is also called the orientation tower, not because the four cardinal directions are molded at its top but because an orientation table sought by the Touring club de France, encircles it at the  level. This orientation table allowed tourists to locate the surrounding mountains with the pleasure to show a unique panorama on the Alps and Grenoble because its height is about the same as the three towers of the Île Verte in Grenoble.

History

It was erected from 20 May 1924 to 4 May 1925 by the architect Auguste Perret who won a competition sponsored by the city for the exhibition, which took place between 21 May and 25 October 1925. The International Exhibition of Hydropower and Tourism focused on the production, transport and broadcast of electricity as well as tourism which was the No. 2 economic resource in the Alps at the beginning of the century. During the exhibition, a floodlight was installed at the top to light the buildings.

On 6 September 1925, the exhibition was opened by Prime Minister Paul Painlevé, Édouard Herriot and André Hesse. The same day, more than 2,000 visitors reached the top of the tower by using the two elevators which drop them off to the orientation platform located at  height. At lunch, Herriot and Hesse went down last and got stuck in an elevator, and the tower staff did not notice, creating some panic among the police services.

The International Exhibition of Hydropower and Tourism was a success. More than one million persons came to the city of 85,000 inhabitants, which got benefits in spite of the huge works undertaken.

In 1929, an antenna was installed at the top of the tower to broadcast radio programmes of the channel "Alpes-Grenoble".

Nowadays, Perret Tower is the only remnant of the exhibition. This tower allowed Perret to prove the huge ability of reinforced concrete and make him famous as a great architect.

Today
In 1960, the tower was closed to the public due to its degradation. In 1998, it was officially declared to be a national heritage site. Currently, the top of the tower is illuminated during the winter and is used as a support for the fireworks of the 14th of July.

No serious maintenance was made after the exhibition, and the tower degradation might become irreversible: iron frameworks are unsheathed or broken and oxidization of the iron framework leads the reinforced concrete to crumble. In 1951, a facade screed was made (not efficient for life span). In 2005, a study by Alain Tillier, chief architect of the national heritage sites, estimated the restoration cost at 4.5 million euros. No work was done, and the tower degradation got worse. In 2012, the Mouton study evaluated the cost at 6 million euros (inside and outside), of which 60% could be supported by a grant from the French government and from the local administrative department (Isère) because the tower is a national heritage site. In these studies, the restoration includes the reopening to public as well as an upgrade to security standards.

The 12 September 2013, the petition "Save the Perret tower" was introduced. It got more than 500 signatures during the first week and some local newspapers publicized the information.

The 6 February 2014, the organisation "Ensemble pour la Tour Perret" ("Together for the Perret tower") was created to promote protection and restoration of the Perret tower, to publicize its history and its heritage interest and to ensure and contribute to its promotion.

During the municipal elections in March 2014, some parties promised to act for the tower restoration: the list "Croire en Grenoble" (UMP, UDI, AEI), the list "Imagine Grenoble" (Modem), the list " Aimer Grenoble pour vous" (PS, PCF, Cap21, MRC, PRG, GE, GO Citoyenneté), and the list "Grenoble une ville pour tous" (EELV, PG, Les Alternatifs, GA, ADES, Réseau Citoyen).

Bibliography 
Cédric Avenier, L'ordre du béton. La tour Perret de Grenoble, CRAterre éditions, Labex AE&CC, ENSA Grenoble, mai 2013, 48 p.
Cédric Avenier, Anne Coste, The Perret Tower : architecture, art and press (relations d’Auguste Perret avec le milieu artistique de son époque : projet de la Tour d’orientation de Grenoble), 4th international Congress on Construction History, Paris, juillet 2012.
Cédric Avenier, Anne Coste, The Perret Tower : symbol of the 1925 International Hydro-electric Power Exhibition in Grenoble, and of the Cement and Concrete Industry, Engineering History and Heritage, ICE Publishing, London, décembre 2011.
Cédric Avenier, Ciments de l’Isère, deux siècles d’innovation, DL les patrimoines, 2010, 80 p.

See also 
Tour Perret (Amiens), a skyscraper designed by Perret

References

External links
  The Perret tower on the official web site of the Grenoble tourism office

Buildings and structures in Grenoble
World's fair architecture in France
1920s architecture
Monuments historiques of Isère
Octagonal buildings